Motor Home Massacre is a horror film written and directed by Allen Wilbanks that was released on August 2, 2005 and starring Shan Holleman, Nelson Bonilla, Tanya Fraser and Justin Geer. It was produced by iStream LLC and distributed by Lionsgate.

Plot
A lighthearted vacation in a vintage RV turns into a deadly roller-coaster ride for seven young friends in this gorefest tinged with touches of camp. A psychopath armed with night vision goggles and a machete stalks his prey, and there seems to be no escaping his brutal intentions.

External links
Official Website
IMDB webpage
Rotten Tomatoes webpage

2005 films
2005 horror films
American comedy horror films
2000s comedy horror films
2005 comedy films
2000s English-language films
2000s American films